Phelps-Terkel was a Los Angeles based department store specializing in men's clothing. Its Miracle Mile, Los Angeles Modernist store at 5550 Wilshire Boulevard, corner of S. Burnside Avenue, was considered a landmark by the Los Angeles Conservancy's Modern Committee.

The store was founded by Richard B. Terkel and David S. Phelps in 1923.

In 1965 the firm became part of the Phelps-Wilger chain, based in Westwood, Los Angeles; together the new chain had store in:
 Miracle Mile
 Pasadena
 Westwood (2)
 Sherman Oaks
 Newport Beach (Fashion Island) - store was to open in 1965
There was at one time also a store in Lakewood Center.
Tom Selleck was once a salesclerk at the Sherman Oaks store.
In its final years, Phelps-Meager was renamed Phelps, and closed in 1992.

References

Defunct department stores based in Greater Los Angeles